In mathematics, the th Motzkin number is the number of different ways of drawing non-intersecting chords  between  points on a circle (not necessarily touching every point by a chord). The Motzkin numbers are named after Theodore Motzkin and have diverse applications in geometry, combinatorics and number theory.

The Motzkin numbers  for  form the sequence:

 1, 1, 2, 4, 9, 21, 51, 127, 323, 835, 2188, 5798, 15511, 41835, 113634, 310572, 853467, 2356779, 6536382, 18199284, 50852019, 142547559, 400763223, 1129760415, 3192727797, 9043402501, 25669818476, 73007772802, 208023278209, 593742784829, ...

Examples 

The following figure shows the 9 ways to draw non-intersecting chords between 4 points on a circle:

The following figure shows the 21 ways to draw non-intersecting chords between 5 points on a circle:

Properties 

The Motzkin numbers satisfy the recurrence relations

The Motzkin numbers can be expressed in terms of binomial coefficients and Catalan numbers:

and inversely,

The generating function  of the Motzkin numbers satisfies

and is explicitly expressed as

An integral representation of Motzkin numbers is given by
.

They have the asymptotic behaviour
.

A Motzkin prime is a Motzkin number that is prime. , only four such primes are known:

 2, 127, 15511, 953467954114363

Combinatorial interpretations 

Also, the Motzkin number for  gives the number of routes on the upper right quadrant of a grid from coordinate (0, 0) to coordinate (0) in  steps if one is allowed to move only to the right (up, down or straight) at each step but forbidden from dipping below the  = 0 axis.

For example, the following figure shows the 9 valid Motzkin paths from (0, 0) to (4, 0):

 showed that vexillary involutions are enumerated by Motzkin numbers.

See also
 Telephone number which represent the number of ways of drawing chords if intersections are allowed
 Delannoy number
 Narayana number
 Schröder number

References

External links
 

Integer sequences
Enumerative combinatorics